Koshalendraprasadji Pande (October 1972 – present) is the current acharya of the NarNarayan Dev Gadi of the Swaminarayan Sampraday (15 October 2004 – present) and is the 7th successor of Swaminarayan in the North Diocese (NarNarayan Dev Gadi, Ahmedabad).

Biography
Koshalendraprasadji Pande was born on 18 October 1972 in Ahmedabad, India.  He is the eldest son of Tejendraprasad Pande, the 6th acharya of the NarNarayan Dev Gadi of the Swaminarayan Sampraday.  Per tradition in Brahmin households, Pande received his Yajñopavītam, or sacred thread, during the bicentennial celebrations of Swaminarayan in 1981 at Kalupur Swaminarayan Mandir.  He studied at St. Xavier School and St. Xavier College in Ahmedabad. He was appointed as acharya on 15 October 2004.

Works
 He established NarNarayan Dev Yuvak Mandal (NNDYM) 
 He started celebration of festivals on a large scale before in 1981 in the Swaminarayan Sampraday such as Shardha Satabdi Mahotav, Shashti Purti Mahotsav and the Chhapaiya Nij Mandir Pran Pratishta Mahotsav.  
 He took an initiative for broadcast of TV series Jai Shree Swaminarayan throughout the world.

See also 
 Swaminarayan Sampraday
 NarNarayan Dev Gadi
 Acharya Shree Tejendraprasadji Maharaj - Nivrut Acharya

Notes

References 
 Dharmakul
 Pranpratishtha of new temple in USA by Acharya of Ahmedabad.

External links 
Ahmedabad Shree NarNarayan Dev Gadi Website

1971 births
Living people
Swaminarayan Sampradaya
Acharyas
Indian Hindu spiritual teachers
Gujarati people
People from Gujarat
21st-century Hindu religious leaders
People from Ahmedabad